Heinrich Träg (3 January 1893 – 13 October 1976) was a German football forward who played for 1. FC Nürnberg.

Club career
Träg joined Nürnberg in 1911, and went on to win five German football championships with the club. In January 1918, Heinrich scored 10 out of 19 goals 1. FC Nürnberg scored in a 19-0 victory against TV 1891 Regensburg. In a game against Jena, in 1919, in the first half, 1. FC Nürnberg were behind 2-0, but by the full-time whistle, the score was 9-2 with Heinrich scoring 7.

International career
He also made six appearances for the German national team between 1921 and 1926.

Honours
 German football championship: 1920, 1921, 1924, 1925, 1927

References

External links
 

1893 births
1976 deaths
Footballers from Nuremberg
German footballers
Germany international footballers
Association football forwards
1. FC Nürnberg players